The Washington Nationals are a Major League Baseball (MLB) franchise based in Washington, D.C. Prior to 2005, they were known as the Montreal Expos and based in Montreal, Quebec, Canada. The Nationals play in the National League East division. Since the institution of MLB's Rule 4 Draft, the Expos/Nationals have selected 73 players in the first round. Officially known as the "First-Year Player Draft", the Rule 4 Draft is MLB's primary mechanism for assigning amateur baseball players from high schools, colleges, and other amateur baseball clubs to its teams. The draft order is determined based on the previous season's standings, with the team possessing the worst record receiving the first pick. In addition, teams which lost free agents in the previous off-season may be awarded compensatory or supplementary picks. The First-Year Player Draft is unrelated to the 1968 expansion draft in which the Expos initially filled their roster.

Of the 73 players picked in the first round by Montreal or Washington, 38 have been pitchers, the most of any position; 27 of them were right-handed, while 11 were left-handed. Thirteen outfielders, ten shortstops, five third basemen, four catchers, and three first basemen were also taken. The team has never drafted a player at second base. In all, 40 of the players were drafted from high school, 27 from four-year colleges, and four from junior colleges. Eleven of the players came from high schools, universities, or junior colleges in the state of California, and Florida follows with 10 players. They have also drafted two players from Puerto Rico: Josue Estrada (1993) and Hiram Bocachica (1994).

No pick has been elected to the Hall of Fame. One first-round pick, Bryce Harper (2010), has been named Rookie of the Year and Most Valuable Player in his career, earning National League rookie honors in 2012 and National League MVP honors in 2015, both with the Nationals. Harper is the second of the Nationals' two overall #1 selections; the first was Stephen Strasburg in 2009. Condredge Holloway (1971) was drafted as a shortstop, but ended up becoming a quarterback in the Canadian Football League, and was inducted into the Canadian Football Hall of Fame in 1999.

The Expos/Nationals have made 19 selections in the supplemental round of the draft and six compensatory picks since their entry into the league in 1969. These additional picks are provided when a team loses a particularly valuable free agent in the previous off-season, or, more recently, if a team fails to sign a draft pick from the previous year. The Expos/Nationals have failed to sign four of their first-round picks: Condredge Holloway (1971), Charles Johnson (1989), John Patterson (1996), and Aaron Crow (2008). The Expos received no compensation for failing to sign Holloway, but received the 40th pick in 1990, the 52nd pick in 1997, and the 10th pick in 2009 for failing to sign Johnson, Patterson, and Crow, respectively.

Key

Picks

See also
Washington Nationals minor league players

Footnotes
 Through the 2012 draft, free agents were evaluated by the Elias Sports Bureau and rated "Type A", "Type B", or not compensation-eligible. If a team offered arbitration to a player but that player refused and subsequently signed with another team, the original team was able to receive additional draft picks. If a "Type A" free agent left in this way, his previous team received a supplemental pick and a compensatory pick from the team with which he signed. If a "Type B" free agent left in this way, his previous team received only a supplemental pick. Since the 2013 draft, free agents are no longer classified by type; instead, compensatory picks are only awarded if the team offered its free agent a contract worth at least the average of the 125 current richest MLB contracts. However, if the free agent's last team acquired the player in a trade during the last year of his contract, it is ineligible to receive compensatory picks for that player.
 The Expos and other expansion teams (Seattle Pilots, Kansas City Royals, and San Diego Padres) did not receive first-round picks in 1968. They began the selection process at the end of the fourth round of the regular phase.
 The Expos gained a compensatory first-round pick in 1980 from the New York Yankees for losing free agent Rudy May.
 The Expos lost their first-round pick in 1982 to the Chicago Cubs as compensation for signing free agent Tim Blackwell.
 The Expos gained a compensatory first-round pick in 1983 from the San Francisco Giants for losing free agent Joel Youngblood.
 The Expos gained a supplemental first-round pick in 1984 for losing free agent Manny Trillo.
 The Expos gained a supplemental first-round pick in 1987 for losing free agent Andre Dawson.
 The Expos gained a compensatory first-round pick in 1990 from the California Angels for losing free agent Mark Langston.
 The Expos gained a supplemental first-round pick in 1990 for losing free agent Mark Langston.
 The Expos gained a supplemental first-round pick in 1990 for losing free agent Hubie Brooks.
 The Expos gained a supplemental first-round pick in 1990 for losing free agent Pascual Perez.
 The Expos gained a supplemental first-round pick in 1990 for failing to sign draft pick Charles Johnson.
 The Expos gained a supplemental first-round pick in 1993 for losing free agent Spike Owen.
 The Expos gained a supplemental first-round pick in 1994 for losing free agent Dennis Martínez.
 The Expos gained a supplemental first-round pick in 1997 for losing free agent Mel Rojas.
 The Expos gained a supplemental first-round pick in 1997 for losing free agent Moisés Alou.
 The Expos gained a supplemental first-round pick in 1997 for losing free agent Mel Rojas.
 The Expos gained a supplemental first-round pick in 1997 for losing free agent Moisés Alou.
 The Expos gained a supplemental first-round pick in 1997 for losing free agent Mel Rojas.
 The Expos gained a supplemental first-round pick in 1997 for losing free agent Moisés Alou.
 The Expos gained a supplemental first-round pick in 1997 for failing to sign draft pick John Patterson.
 The Expos gained a supplemental first-round pick in 1998 for losing free agent Darrin Fletcher.
 The Nationals gained a compensatory first-round pick in 2006 from the Oakland Athletics for losing free agent Esteban Loaiza.
 The Nationals gained a supplemental first-round pick in 2007 for losing free agent Alfonso Soriano.
 The Nationals gained a supplemental first-round pick in 2007 for losing free agent José Guillén.
 The Nationals gained a supplemental first-round pick in 2009 for failing to sign draft pick Aaron Crow.
 The Nationals gained a compensatory first-round pick in 2011 from the Chicago White Sox for losing free agent Adam Dunn.
 The Nationals gained a supplemental first-round pick in 2011 for losing free agent Adam Dunn.
 The Nationals gained a supplemental first-round pick in 2016 for losing free agent Jordan Zimmerman.

References
General references

In-text citations

First-round draft picks
Washington Nationals first-round draft picks